The GeneXpert Infinity is an automated cartridge-based nucleic acid amplification test (NAAT) which is able to tell whether the subject fluid contains shreds of the SARS-CoV-2 virus, amongst others. It is manufactured by Cepheid Inc.

References

Medical tests
Laboratory techniques
Molecular biology
Polymerase chain reaction
Biotechnology